Events in the year 1910 in Portugal.

Incumbents
Monarch: Manuel II (until 5 October)
President: Teófilo Braga (from 5 October)
Prime Minister: António Teixeira de Sousa (until 5 October); Teófilo Braga (from 5 October)

Events
28 August – Portuguese legislative election, 1910.
5 October – A coup d'état and proclamation of the Portuguese First Republic
Disestablishment of the Progressive Dissidence political party.

Arts and entertainment

Sports
S.C. Farense founded
C.S. Marítimo founded
Vitória F.C. founded
C.D. Nacional founded

Births

1 April – Francisco Castro, Portuguese footballer (d. unknown)
11 April – António de Spínola, military officer, politician, writer (died 1996).

Deaths

References

 
1910s in Portugal
Portugal
Years of the 20th century in Portugal
Portugal